Nicole Rubanovich (born May 9, 1998, in) is an Israeli weightlifter. She won a bronze medal at the 2019 European Weightlifting Championships in the 71 kg category.

At the 2021 European Junior & U23 Weightlifting Championships in Rovaniemi, Finland, she won the gold medal in her event.

References

External links
 

1998 births
Living people
Sportspeople from Beersheba
Israeli female weightlifters
European Weightlifting Championships medalists
20th-century Israeli women
21st-century Israeli women